The Ponza class is a series of five Coastal transport ships of the Marina Militare, named as Moto Trasporto Fari, MTF (Lighthouses Vessels).

 Roles 

Ponza class ships are designed for:
 the maintenance and modernization of the coastal maritime signalling and headlights
 recovery and replacement of buoys, beacons, lights, catenaries, pylons, etc.
 can also be used for transport of various materials
 as well as water and fuel or other goods for the supply of naval ships or small islands
 minelayer roles

 Ships Ponza (A5364) 

Ship Ponza is a unit of type Motion Transport Lighthouses (M.T.F.), which takes the name of the homonymous island of the Pontian Islands in the Tyrrhenian Sea, launched in 1988, in force to the First Group Auxiliary Ships (COMGRUPAUS UNO), was relocated to the First Naval Division (COMDINAV UNO) in 2021.

The vessel is primarily used for activities related to the maintenance and proper functioning of maritime signals necessary to ensure safe navigation in coastal waters. For this reason the unit is equipped with a crane and a winch capable of lifting respectively up to 15 and 20 tons of weight needed to move the heavy boulders of which the signals themselves are composed.

Ship Ponza, in addition to the activities related to the Lighthouses Campaign, a task for which it was designed in the past, has carried out several operations in favor of the population, such as the transport of humanitarian aid to the Bosnian people in the years 1995 - 1996 and the conduct, concurrently with the civil protection, of the Forest Fire Emergency Campaign in the North East of Sardinia. The unit, moreover, is employed in activities related to the training of future ship commanders, which School of Naval Command and Traineeship of maneuver for officers (Tir.M.Uff.).

References

External links
 Ponza (A 5364) Marina Militare website

Auxiliary transport ship classes
Ships built in Ancona
Auxiliary ships of the Italian Navy